Serbs are, by large, first or second generation immigrants from other republics of former Yugoslavia. In the 2002 census, 38,964 people of Slovenia declared Serb ethnicity, corresponding to 2% of the total population, making them the largest ethnic minority in the country.

History
The vast majority of the Serbs in Slovenia are first or second generation settlers from other republics of former Yugoslavia, mostly from Bosnia and Herzegovina and Serbia, but also from Croatia and Montenegro. After World War II, many Serbs employed in the Yugoslav People's Army were stationed in the Socialist Republic of Slovenia with their families. In the period of 1971-1981, many ethnic Serbs migrated from Bosnia and Herzegovina to pursue better careers and economic opportunities in Slovenia. Before 1991, many Serbs in Slovenia registered as Yugoslavs, and many still prefer referring to their mother language as Serbo-Croatian, rather than Serbian.

There also exists an indigenous community of Serbs in White Carniola from 16th century (see Serbs of White Carniola).

In 2013, the combined community association of Serbs in Slovenia requested that Serbs be given the status of national minority.

Demographics
Most of Serbs in Slovenia are concentrated in larger urban areas, especially in Ljubljana and Jesenice. The table shows the year and number and percentage of Serbs in Slovenia after World War II, according to the official censuses.

It also has to be noted that in the last census in 2002, more than 10% of all Slovenian population decided not to answer the question regarding their ethnic affiliation. All these elements make the estimate of the overall number of Serbs in Slovenia difficult.

Culture 

Yugonostalgia is strong among the older generation. The urban former Yugoslav immigrant community in Slovenia have developed a "Balkan culture" in the 1990s. 

The Leskovac-styled grilled meat, including ćevapčići, have today become part of everyday-diet in Slovenia.

Language

Most Serbs in Slovenia use Slovene as their language of communication, since only 4,300 people in Slovenia declared that they use only Serbian language at home, while about 15,000 declared they use both languages at home. However more than 31,000 people declared their mother tongue as Serbian (and another 36,000 as Serbo-Croatian).

A mixed Slovenian–Serbian slang, srboslovenščina, became an "unofficial" language in football and construction building, among other traditional domains of post-war immigrants from former Yugoslavia.

Religion
Serbs in Slovenia are predominantly Eastern Orthodox by faith, adhering to the Serbian Orthodox Church.

Notable people

Ilija Arnautović, architect
Katarina Branković, Countess of Celje
Jovan Hadži, zoologist
Spomenka Hribar, sociologist, politician and public intellectual (Serbian father)
Zoran Janković, manager and politician, mayor of Ljubljana, Serbian-born, Serbian father
Dušan Jovanović, theatre director
Irena Kazazić, painter and writer
Petar Matić, businessman
Robert Pešut, a.k.a. "Magnifico", musician and actor (Serbian father)
Radko Polič, actor
Božidar Rašica, architect, scenographer and painter
Simona Škrabec, Slovenian-Catalan author and translator (Serbian father)

Sportspeople
Milenko Ačimovič, football player, Serbian parents
Siniša Anđelković, football player, Serbian parents
Dragan Gajić, handball player
Mladen Dabanovič, football player, Serbian parent
Luka Dončić, basketball player, father of Serbian origin
Saša Dončić, basketball coach and former player
Jan Oblak, football player (Serbian mother)
Sara Isakovič, swimmer (Serbian father)
Goran Janus, ski jumper and ski jumping coach
Darko Karapetrovič, football player
Marko Milič, basketball player, Serbian father 
Rasho Nesterovič, basketball player
Aleksej Nikolić, basketball player
Mitja Nikolić, basketball player
Milivoje Novakovič, football player
Teja Oblak, basketball player (Serbian mother)
Damir Pekič, football player
Danilo Popivoda, football player
Miroslav Radulovič, football player
Aleksandar Rodić, football player, Serbian parents
Marija Šestak, athlete
Dalibor Stevanovič, football player
Petar Stojanović, football player
Slaviša Stojanovič, former football player and manager, Serbian-born
Dejan Vinčić, volleyball player
Sasha Vujačić, basketball player, Serbian father
Marko Vukićević, alpine skier
Zlatko Zahović, former football player (Bosnian descent)

See also 

Serbia–Slovenia relations
Serb community of White Carniola
Serbs in Croatia
Serbs in Italy

References

Sources

 
Serbian Orthodox Church in Slovenia
Ethnic groups in Slovenia
Slovenia
Slovenia
Slovenia
Slovenia